Kevin Lamar Evans (born February 22, 1962) is an entertainment executive. Evans was Senior Vice President/Head of Urban Music Division at RCA Records; President, Urban Music Division at All American Communications; and Head of Gospel and Urban Music A&R at A&M Records.

Life and career 
Evans attended Georgia State University in Atlanta, where he majored in Communications. He also attended Columbia School of Broadcasting. 

Evans signed artists such as Tyrese, Angie Stone, Rome, Kevon Edmonds, Freddie Jackson and Chantay Savage.

Evans held executive positions at RCA, A&M, Scotti Brothers/All American And Light Records, where he was an A&R executive overseeing artists such as Janet Jackson, Barry White, James Brown, Amy Grant, 'N Sync, Robyn, SWV, Shirley Caesar, James Cleveland, Yolanda Adams, Commissioned, Fred Hammond, Beau Williams, and Douglas Miller. During his tenure at A&M, Evans produced the "If I Could Be Like Mike" Gatorade jingle starring Michael Jordan.

Accomplishments 
Evans is responsible for A&R, signing, and executive producing artists who have sold over 80 million records worldwide. He has received numerous awards and recognitions, including Impact Music Executive of the Year in 1997 and Gavin Magazine's Urban Music Executive of the Year in 1998.

Evans co-wrote the chart-topping single titled "Hold On", which was originally released on Yolanda Adams 2007 holiday album "What a Wonderful Time". The song was then released on Hidden Beach Recordings' 2008 compilation inspired by Barack Obama's groundbreaking presidential campaign titled "Yes We Can: Voices of a Grassroots Movement". The song was also featured on the WOW Gospel 2008 compilation series distributed through Verity/Jive/Sony and the EMI Music Christian Music Group. This album was certified Gold in the US in 2008 by the Recording Industry Association of America (RIAA).

Discography – R & B, pop, rap and jazz 
 Tyrese – signed, A&R, executive producer
 Barry White – A&R
 James Brown – A&R
 Kevon Edmonds – signed, A&R, executive producer
 Angie Stone – signed, A&R, executive producer
 Freddie Jackson – signed, A&R, executive producer
 SWV – A&R, executive producer
 Amy Grant – A&R/Remix
 N' Sync – A&R/Remix
 Aaron Neville – A&R/Remix
 Janet Jackson – A&R/Remix
 Yolanda Adams – A&R, executive producer
 Herb Alpert – A&R/Remix
 Michael Jordan (Gatorade "If I Could Be Like Mike") — A&R, producer, executive producer
 Waiting To Exhale – Soundtrack – A&R the song ("All Night Long" Featuring SWV)
 Men In Black – Soundtrack – A&R the song ("Men In Black" Featuring COCO of SWV)
 Chantay Savage – A&R, executive producer
 Rome – signed, A&R, executive producer
 Vesta – A&R
 Robyn – A&R
 Christopher Williams — A&R
 Tina Moore- signed, A&R, executive producer
 Vertical Hold- signed, A&R, executive producer
 Geral Alston, signed, A&R, executive producer
 Silk E. Fyne- signed, A&R, executive producer
 Skeelo- A&R
 12 Gauge- signed, A&R, executive producer
 Dina Carroll- A&R
 Vanessa Rubin- A&R, executive producer
 Rodney Mansfield- A&R, executive producer
 Bad Boyz of the Industry- signed, A&R, executive producer
 Nikki Kixx- signed, A&R, executive producer
 Sweet Sable- signed, A&R, executive producer
 Elusion- signed, A&R, executive producer
 Alfonso Blackwell- signed, A&R, executive producer
 Varnell Brown- A&R
 Erika Yancey- A&R, executive producer
 Tami- signed, A&R, executive producer
 Shiro- A&R
 Creo D- signed, A&R, executive producer
 Gold Teet- signed, A&R, executive producer
 E.O.L.- signed, A&R, executive producer
 Jennifer Brown- A&R

Discography (gospel) 
 Shirley Caesar – A&M / Word
 James Cleveland – Executive Producer, A&M / C.G.I
 Winans – Light Records
 Andre Crouch – Light Records
 Edwin Hawkins –Light Records
 Termaine Hawkins – A&M
 Commissioned – A&M / Benson / Light Records
 Yolanda Adams – A&R / Executive Producer
 Darryl Coley – Light Records
 Fred Hammond – A&M / Benson
 Vicki Winans – Light Records
 Dorothy Norwood – A&M
 Thomas Whitfield – A&M / Benson
 Helen Baylor – A&M / Word
 Milton Brunson – A&M / Word
 Douglas Miller – Executive Producer, A&M / C.G.I.
 Beau Williams – Light Records- Manager
 Richard Smallwood – A&M / Word
 Pops Staples – A&M / I AM
 Hawkins Family – Light Records
 Sandra Crouch – Light Records
 Melvin Williams – Light Records
 Dawkins & Dawkins – A&M / Benson
 Olanda Draper – A&M / Word
 Dannibelle Hall – Executive Producer A&M / C.G.I.
 Veronica & Angela – A&M / Benson
 L.A. Mass Choir – Light Records – Manager
 Kim McFarland – A&M / C.G.I.
 Patrick Henderson – A&M / Benson
 Soul Children of Chicago – A&M / Benson
 Donald Malloy – Executive Producer A&M / C.G.I.
 Chicago Mass Choir – Executive Producer A&M / C.G.I.
 Allen & Allen – Executive Producer A&M / C.G.I.
 Billy & Sarah Gaines – A&M / Benson
 Kingdom – A&M / Benson
 Arthur Scales – A&M / I AM
 Futrell – Light Records
 Rod McGaughy – A&M / I AM
 Edification – Executive Producer A&M
 Evelyn Agee – Executive Producer A&M / C.G.I
 iNDIGO – Distributing Label Executive Producer
 Nicole "Faithful" Franklin -Distributing Label Executive Producer
 Al Mac Will -A&R / Distributing Label Executive Producer

Personal life 
Evans was engaged to film actress Pam Grier in 1998. He has four children from previous relationships.

References 

1962 births
Living people
American entertainment industry businesspeople